On Sunday April 27, 2003, the Tank Barge Bouchard No. 120 struck rocks south of Westport, Massachusetts.  This resulted in a puncture of the barge's hull about twelve feet in length.  As a result, the cargo of the barge, number 6 fuel oil, spilled into the waters of Buzzards Bay, Massachusetts.  While the spill was much smaller than many oil spills, the environmental impacts were felt for years. Estimates of the total amount spilled range from 22,000 to 98,000 gallons of oil according to a publication by the National Oceanic and Atmospheric Administration.

This spill was quite different from some of the more widely known spills like Deepwater Horizon, not just because of its smaller scale, but due to the type of spill that it was. Deepwater, being a spill of oil directly from the ground was pure oil. Bouchard No. 120 contained number 6 Fuel_Oil. A local scientist from Woods Hole Oceanographic Institute explains that the processing of oil yields various components of varying danger to the environment.

NOAA is heavily involved in environmental cleanups of oil spills as well as other damage to wildlife and coastal environments in the United States largely through their Damage Assessment Remediation and Recovery Program DARRP. efforts lasted in earnest for several years and continued to some degree until 2007 according to a report by the Buzzards Bay National Estuary Program.

References 

Oil spills in the United States
Disasters in Massachusetts
Transportation disasters in Massachusetts